Brian Wells may refer to:
 Brian Wells (figure skater) (born 1970), American figure skater
 Brian Douglas Wells (1956–2003), American pizza delivery man killed by a bomb

See also 

 Bryan Wells (disambiguation)

de:Brian Wells Brian was being controlled by others and told to rob a bank, 250,000 wad told to be stolen but he only got 8,000. Police failed to understand early enough to help Brian Wells